Albion Knight may refer to:

 Albion W. Knight Jr. (1924–2012), archbishop of the United Episcopal Church
 Albion W. Knight (1859–1936), bishop in the Episcopal Church